Isaac Gómez (born 3 June 1934) is a Filipino sprinter. He competed in the men's 100 metres at the 1960 Summer Olympics.

References

External links
 

1934 births
Living people
Athletes (track and field) at the 1960 Summer Olympics
Filipino male sprinters
Olympic track and field athletes of the Philippines
Place of birth missing (living people)
Athletes (track and field) at the 1958 Asian Games
Athletes (track and field) at the 1962 Asian Games
Medalists at the 1958 Asian Games
Medalists at the 1962 Asian Games
Asian Games medalists in athletics (track and field)
Asian Games gold medalists for the Philippines
Asian Games bronze medalists for the Philippines
Philippine Sports Hall of Fame inductees